Llanwern Golf Club (Welsh: Clwb Golff Llanwern) is a golf club based just outside Llanwern at Newport, Wales. It is an 18-hole parkland course and is reputedly one of the oldest in South Wales. In 2010, the club based PGA professional Leanne Cooper was named the Ladies European Tour-sponsored PGA female assistant of the year. This club has a "members only" policy.

See also
Golf in Wales

References

Golf clubs and courses in Wales
Golf club